McLean is an unincorporated community and census-designated place (CDP) in Fairfax County in Northern Virginia. McLean is home to many diplomats, military, members of Congress, and high-ranking government officials partially due to its proximity to Washington, D.C., the Pentagon and the Central Intelligence Agency. It is the location of Hickory Hill, the former home of Ethel Kennedy, the widow of Robert F. Kennedy. It is also the location of Salona, the former home of Light-Horse Harry Lee, the Revolutionary War hero.

The population of the community was 50,773 at the 2020 census. It is located between the Potomac River and Vienna. McLean is often distinguished by its luxury homes and its nearby high-profit shopping destinations, Tysons Corner Center and Tysons Galleria. The two McLean ZIP Codes – 22101 and 22102 – are among the most expensive ZIP Codes in Virginia and the United States. In 2018, data from the American Community Survey revealed that McLean was the third wealthiest city in the United States, based on its poverty rate of 2.6% and its median household income of $190,258.

History

The community received its name from John Roll McLean, the former publisher and owner of The Washington Post. Along with Stephen Benton Elkins and French aristocrat Jean-Pierre Guenard, in 1902 he bought the charter for the Great Falls and Old Dominion Railroad. Completed in 1906, it connected the area with Washington, D.C. McLean named a railroad station costing $1,500, of which $500 was raised locally, after himself where the rail line (traveling on the present route of Old Dominion Drive) crossed the old Chain Bridge Road. The community itself was founded in 1910, when the communities of Lewinsville and Langley merged.

Geography
McLean is located at  (38.9342776, −77.1774801) at an elevation of 285 feet (87 m).

The community lies in the Piedmont upland on the west bank of the Potomac River. The river forms the community's northern and eastern borders, and a number of its smaller tributaries flow north and northeast through the CDP. From west to east, these include Bull Neck Run, Scott Run, Dead Run, Turkey Run, and Pimmit Run.

As an inner suburb of Washington, D.C., McLean is a part of both the Washington Metropolitan Area and the larger Baltimore-Washington Metropolitan Area. The CDP includes the unincorporated communities of Langley, Lewinsville, and West McLean, and it borders several other Washington suburbs including: Potomac and Cabin John, Maryland, to the north; Brookmont, Maryland, to the northeast; Arlington to the southeast; Falls Church to the south; Idylwood, Pimmit Hills, and Tysons to the southwest; Wolf Trap to the west; and Great Falls to the northwest.

McLean has a humid climate (Cfa) and is in hardiness zone 7a.

Demographics

As of the 2010 census, there were 48,115 people, 17,063 households, and 13,453 families residing in the CDP. The racial makeup of the CDP was 79.3% White, 14.9% Asian, 1.8% African American, 0.1% Native American, 0.8% from other races, and 3.0% from two or more races. Hispanics and Latinos of any race were 4.9% of the population.

There were 17,063 households, out of which 39.6% had children under the age of 18 living with them, 70.5% were married couples living together, 2.4% had a male householder with no wife present, 6.0% had a female householder with no husband present, and 21.2% were non-families. Of all households, 18.0% were made up of individuals, and 10.3% had someone living alone who was 65 years of age or older. The average household size was 2.80, and the average family size was 3.17.

The median age was 45.1 years. 26.9% of the population was under the age of 18, 4.3% was 18 to 24, 18.6% was 25 to 44, 33.2% was 45 to 64, and 17.0% were 65 years of age or older. The gender makeup of the community was 48.2% male and 51.8% female.

The median income for a household in the CDP was $164,888, and the median income for a family was $194,832. Males had a median income of $132,714 versus $87,663 for females. The per capita income for the CDP was $87,073. About 1.3% of families and 2.6% of the population were below the poverty line, including 2.6% of those under the age of 18 and 3.2% of those 65 and older.

Economy
Mars and Geebo are among the companies based in McLean. Many businesses in neighboring Tysons, particularly those east of Leesburg Pike (VA Route 7) have a McLean mailing address, because the US Postal Service boundary for West McLean (ZIP Code 22102) generally follows Leesburg Pike.

As of 2012, 61.6% of the population over the age of 16 was in the labor force. 0.4% was in the armed forces, and 61.2% was in the civilian labor force with 58.4% employed and 2.9% unemployed. The occupational composition of the employed civilian labor force was: 73.2% in management, business, science, and arts; 17.9% in sales and office occupations; 5.5% in service occupations; 2.0% in natural resources, construction, and maintenance; 1.4% in production, transportation, and material moving. The three industries employing the largest percentages of the working civilian labor force were:  professional, scientific, and management, and administrative and waste management services (27.8%); educational services, health care, and social assistance (17.7%); and public administration (16.6%).

The cost of living in McLean is very high; compared to a U.S. average of 100, the cost of living index for the community is 142.6. As of 2012, the median home value in the community was $908,000, the median selected monthly owner cost was $3,803 for housing units with a mortgage and $1,000+ for those without, and the median gross rent was $2,000+.

Government and infrastructure

The headquarters of the Central Intelligence Agency is located in the Langley area of McLean, and the headquarters of the Office of the Director of National Intelligence is also located in McLean. The U.S. Department of Transportation's Turner-Fairbank Highway Research Center is also located down the street from the CIA headquarters.

Education

Public primary and secondary schools
McLean residents are zoned to schools in the Fairfax County Public Schools (FCPS).
FCPS public elementary schools within the CDP include Chesterbrook; Churchill Road; Haycock; Kent Gardens; Franklin Sherman, and Spring Hill. FCPS public middle schools within the CDP include James Fenimore Cooper Middle School and Henry Wadsworth Longfellow Middle School. FCPS public high schools within the CDP include Langley High School and McLean High School.

In addition, the Mount Daniel School of the Falls Church City Public Schools is physically within the McLean CDP.

Private primary and secondary schools

Several private schools, ranging from pre-school to 12th grade, are located in McLean, including The Langley School, The Madeira School, The Potomac School, Oakcrest School, Saint Luke Catholic School, Saint John School, Brooksfield Montessori, The Montessori School of McLean, and The Country Day School.

The German School Washington, D.C. was previously in McLean.

Higher education
Nearby colleges and universities include the Marymount University in Arlington and DeVry University (Arlington campus). The University of Virginia's School of Continuing and Professional Studies has an academic center in Falls Church, just south of McLean. George Mason University is located 9 miles southwest of McLean in Fairfax, Virginia, while American University, Georgetown University and George Washington University are located 6, 7, and 9 miles east of McLean, respectively, in Washington, D.C.

Public libraries
Fairfax County Public Library operates the Dolley Madison Library in the CDP.

Weekend educational programs
The Washington Japanese Language School (WJLS, ワシントン日本語学校 Washington Nihongo Gakkō), a supplementary weekend Japanese school, previously held classes at St. Luke Catholic School in McLean. The institution, giving supplemental education to Japanese-speaking children in the Washington DC area, was founded in 1958, making it the oldest Japanese government-sponsored supplementary school in the U.S.

The Polish School of Washington, D.C., holds classes on Saturdays at Longfellow Middle School, which are funded by the Polish Embassy in Washington, D.C. ABRACE Inc., a Brazilian Portuguese heritage language program, holds weekly classes at McLean High School for children ages 3 to 18.

Transportation

The Capital Beltway, George Washington Memorial Parkway, Interstate 66, Dulles Access Road, Dolley Madison Boulevard/Chain Bridge Road, Georgetown Pike, and Old Dominion Drive all run through McLean.

The Washington Metro's Silver Line is southwest of downtown McLean.  Both the Silver and Orange lines physically enter the borders in between East Falls Church and West Falls Church.  The McLean station on the Silver Line is in the McLean CDP but lies along VA Route 123 about two miles west of downtown McLean. Other Metro stations nearby include West Falls Church in the Orange line, and East Falls Church, on both the Silver and Orange lines, and the Tysons Corner station on the Silver line which also has a McLean address.

WMATA (MetroBus) and Fairfax Connector each have several bus routes traveling through McLean, including routes connecting downtown McLean with the McLean Metrorail station.

Parks and recreation
The McLean Little League is also located in McLean. In 2005, the girls' All-Star softball team from McLean Little League won the Little League Softball World Series Championship in Portland, Oregon. MLL's girls' All-Star softball team has been the Little League Softball World Series runner-up twice, in 2004 and in 2013.  The Mount Daniel School Park, operated by The City of Falls Church, is physically within the McLean CDP. Clemyjontri Park opened in 2006.

Notable residents

Due to its proximity to Washington, D.C., numerous figures from U.S. politics and government live or have lived in McLean, including President Joe Biden and First Lady Jill Biden, former Vice President Dick Cheney and his family, former U.S. Supreme Court Justice Anthony Kennedy, and U.S. Senators Byron Dorgan, Patrick Leahy, Don Nickles, and George Washington University law professor Jonathan Turley. Foreign diplomats such as Turki bin Faisal Al Saud and Bandar bin Sultan have also lived in McLean. Other famous residents have included the one of the "fathers of the internet", Vint Cerf, former Republican Speaker of the House of Representatives Newt Gingrich, author and political activist Gore Vidal, science fiction writer James Tiptree, Jr., hockey player Alexander Ovechkin of the Washington Capitals, and basketball players Bradley Beal and Otto Porter for the Washington Wizards. Businessman Steve Salis became a resident of McLean after he purchased Bradley Beal's mansion in August 2020.

References

External links

 

 
Census-designated places in Fairfax County, Virginia
Virginia populated places on the Potomac River
Washington metropolitan area
Census-designated places in Virginia